The 12th Satellite Awards, honoring the best in film and television of 2007, were given on December 16, 2007.

Special achievement awards
Auteur Award (for his work on the film The Diving Bell and the Butterfly) – Julian Schnabel

Mary Pickford Award (for outstanding contribution to the entertainment industry) – Kathy Bates

Nikola Tesla Award (for his visual effects in films, especially with computer digital rendering and compositing) – Dennis Muren

Motion picture winners and nominees

Best Actor – Drama
Viggo Mortensen – Eastern Promises
 Christian Bale – Rescue Dawn
 Josh Brolin – No Country for Old Men
 Tommy Lee Jones – In the Valley of Elah
 Frank Langella – Starting Out in the Evening
 Denzel Washington – American Gangster

Best Actor – Comedy or Musical
Ryan Gosling – Lars and the Real Girl
 Don Cheadle – Talk to Me
 Richard Gere – The Hoax
 Ben Kingsley – You Kill Me
 Clive Owen – Shoot 'Em Up
 Seth Rogen – Knocked Up

Best Actress – Drama
Marion Cotillard – La Vie en Rose (La môme)
 Julie Christie – Away from Her
 Angelina Jolie – A Mighty Heart
 Keira Knightley – Atonement
 Laura Linney – The Savages
 Tilda Swinton – Stephanie Daley

Best Actress – Comedy or Musical
Elliot Page – Juno
 Amy Adams – Enchanted
 Cate Blanchett – I'm Not There
 Katherine Heigl – Knocked Up
 Nicole Kidman – Margot at the Wedding
 Emily Mortimer – Lars and the Real Girl

Best Animated or Mixed Media Film
Ratatouille
 300
 Beowulf
 The Golden Compass
 Persepolis
 The Simpsons Movie

Best Art Direction and Production Design
Elizabeth: The Golden Age
 Across the Universe
 Amazing Grace
 The Assassination of Jesse James by the Coward Robert Ford
 Hairspray
 Sunshine

Best Cinematography
The Diving Bell and the Butterfly (Le scaphandre et le papillon) – Janusz Kamiński Across the Universe – Bruno Delbonnel
 The Assassination of Jesse James by the Coward Robert Ford – Roger Deakins
 The Golden Compass – Henry Braham
 There Will Be Blood – Robert Elswit
 Zodiac – Harris Savides

Best Costume DesignElizabeth: The Golden Age
 Amazing Grace
 Atonement
 Goya's Ghosts
 Hairspray
 La Vie en Rose (La môme)

Best Director
Joel Coen and Ethan Coen – No Country for Old Men
 David Cronenberg – Eastern Promises
 Olivier Dahan – La Vie en Rose (La môme)
 Ang Lee – Lust, Caution (Se, jie)
 Sidney Lumet – Before the Devil Knows You're Dead
 Sarah Polley – Away from Her

Best Documentary Film
Sicko
 The 11th Hour
 Darfur Now
 The King of Kong
 Lake of Fire
 No End in Sight

Best Film – Comedy or Musical
Juno
 Hairspray
 Knocked Up
 Lars and the Real Girl
 Margot at the Wedding
 Shoot 'Em Up

Best Film – Drama
No Country for Old Men
 3:10 to Yuma
 Away from Her
 Before the Devil Knows You're Dead
 Eastern Promises
 The Lookout

Best Film Editing
American Gangster
 The Bourne Ultimatum
 Eastern Promises
 La Vie en Rose (La môme)
 The Lookout

Best Foreign Language Film
Lust, Caution (Se, jie) • Taiwan 4 Months, 3 Weeks and 2 Days (4 luni, 3 saptamani si 2 zile) • Romania
 La Vie en Rose (La môme) • France
 Offside • Iran
 The Orphanage (El orfanato) • Spain
 Ten Canoes • Australia

Best Original Score"The Kite Runner" – Alberto Iglesias "The Assassination of Jesse James by the Coward Robert Ford" – Nick Cave
 "Atonement" – Dario Marianelli
 "Eastern Promises" – Howard Shore
 "The Lookout" – James Newton Howard
 "Ratatouille" – Michael Giacchino

Best Original Song"Grace Is Gone" (written by Clint Eastwood and Carole Bayer Sager) – Grace Is Gone
 "Come So Far" (written by Marc Shaiman) – Hairspray
 "Do You Feel Me" (written by Diane Warren) – American Gangster
 "If You Want Me" (written by Glen Hansard and Markéta Irglová) – Once
 "Lyra" (written by Kate Bush) – The Golden Compass
 "Rise" (written by Eddie Vedder) – Into the Wild

Best Screenplay – Adapted
Atonement – Christopher Hampton Away from Her – Sarah Polley
 The Kite Runner – David Benioff
 Lust, Caution (Se, jie) – Hui-Ling Wang and James Schamus
 No Country for Old Men – Joel Coen and Ethan Coen
 Zodiac – James Vanderbilt

Best Screenplay – OriginalJuno – Diablo Cody Before the Devil Knows You're Dead – Kelly Masterson
 Eastern Promises – Steven Knight
 Lars and the Real Girl – Nancy Oliver
 The Lookout – Scott Frank
 Michael Clayton – Tony Gilroy

Best SoundThe Bourne Ultimatum
 300
 The Golden Compass
 I Am Legend
 La Vie en Rose (La môme)
 Pirates of the Caribbean: At World's End

Best Supporting Actor
Casey Affleck – The Assassination of Jesse James by the Coward Robert Ford (TIE) 
Tom Wilkinson – Michael Clayton (TIE)
 Javier Bardem – No Country for Old Men
 Brian Cox – Zodiac
 Jeff Daniels – The Lookout
 Ben Foster – 3:10 to Yuma

Best Supporting Actress
Amy Ryan – Gone Baby Gone
 Ruby Dee – American Gangster
 Taraji P. Henson – Talk to Me
 Saoirse Ronan – Atonement
 Emmanuelle Seigner – La Vie en Rose (La môme)
 Tilda Swinton – Michael Clayton

Best Visual Effects
300
 Beowulf
 The Bourne Ultimatum
 Enchanted
 The Golden Compass
 Transformers

Outstanding Motion Picture Ensemble
Before the Devil Knows You're Dead

Television winners and nominees

Best Actor – Drama Series
Michael C. Hall – Dexter
 Eddie Izzard – The Riches
 Hugh Laurie – House
 Denis Leary – Rescue Me
 Bill Paxton – Big Love
 James Woods – Shark

Best Actor – Comedy or Musical Series
Stephen Colbert – The Colbert Report
 Alec Baldwin – 30 Rock
 Steve Carell – The Office
 Ricky Gervais – Extras
 Zachary Levi – Chuck
 Lee Pace – Pushing Daisies

Best Actor – Miniseries or Motion Picture Made for Television
David Oyelowo – Five Days
 Jim Broadbent – Longford
 Robert Lindsay – The Trial of Tony Blair
 Aidan Quinn – Bury My Heart at Wounded Knee
 Tom Selleck – Jesse Stone: Sea Change
 Toby Stephens – Jane Eyre

Best Actress – Drama Series
Ellen Pompeo – Grey's Anatomy
 Glenn Close – Damages
 Minnie Driver – The Riches
 Sally Field – Brothers & Sisters
 Kyra Sedgwick – The Closer
 Jeanne Tripplehorn – Big Love

Best Actress – Comedy or Musical Series
America Ferrera – Ugly Betty
 Tina Fey – 30 Rock
 Anna Friel – Pushing Daisies
 Patricia Heaton – Back to You
 Felicity Huffman – Desperate Housewives
 Julia Louis-Dreyfus – The New Adventures of Old Christine

Best Actress – Miniseries or Motion Picture Made for Television
Samantha Morton – Longford
 Ellen Burstyn – Oprah Winfrey Presents: Mitch Albom's For One More Day
 Queen Latifah – Life Support
 Debra Messing – The Starter Wife
 Sharon Small – The Inspector Lynley Mysteries
 Ruth Wilson – Jane Eyre

Best Miniseries
The Amazing Mrs Pritchard
 The Company
 Five Days
 Jane Eyre
 The Starter Wife

Best Motion Picture Made for Television
Oprah Winfrey Presents: Mitch Albom's For One More Day
 Bury My Heart at Wounded Knee
 Life Support
 Longford
 The Trial of Tony Blair
 The Wind in the Willows

Best Series – Comedy or Musical
Pushing Daisies
 Chuck
 Extras
 Flight of the Conchords
 Ugly Betty
 Weeds

Best Series – Drama
Dexter
 Brothers & Sisters
 Friday Night Lights
 Grey's Anatomy
 Mad Men
 The Riches

Best Supporting Actor – Series, Miniseries, or Motion Picture Made for Television
David Zayas – Dexter
 Michael Emerson – Lost
 Justin Kirk – Weeds
 T. R. Knight – Grey's Anatomy
 Masi Oka – Heroes
 Andy Serkis – Longford
 Harry Dean Stanton – Big Love

Best Supporting Actress – Series, Miniseries, or Motion Picture Made for Television
Vanessa Williams – Ugly Betty
 Polly Bergen – Desperate Housewives
 Judy Davis – The Starter Wife
 Rachel Griffiths – Brothers & Sisters
 Jaime Pressly – My Name Is Earl
 Chandra Wilson – Grey's Anatomy

Outstanding Television Ensemble
Mad Men

New Media winners and nominees

Best Classic DVD
The Graduate (40th Anniversary Edition)
 Ace in the Hole (The Criterion Collection)
 Cruising (Deluxe Edition)
 The Full Monty (Fully Exposed Edition)
 Funny Face (50th Anniversary Edition)
 Ghost (Special Collector's Edition)
 House of Games (The Criterion Collection)
 The Pirate
 RoboCop (20th Anniversary Collector's Edition)
 Stranger Than Paradise (The Criterion Collection)

Best Documentary DVD
The War
 Addiction
 Alive Day Memories: Home from Iraq
 American Experience (Episode: "The Mormons: Part I")
 Crazy Love
 Jesus Camp
 No End in Sight
 Shut Up and Sing
 Sicko
 An Unreasonable Man

Best DVD Extras
Borat (TIE) 
Masters of Horror (Season 1) (TIE)
 Fiddler on the Roof (2-Disc Collector's Edition)
 Flashdance (Special Collector's Edition)
 The Graduate (40th Anniversary Edition)
 RoboCop (20th Anniversary Collector's Edition)
 The Sergio Leone Anthology
 The Silence of the Lambs (Collector's Edition)
 Viva Pedro: The Almodóvar Collection / Volver
 Wall Street (20th Anniversary Edition)

Best DVD Release of a TV Show
Dexter (Season 1)
 Daniel Deronda
 The House of Eliott (The Complete Collection)
 Lost (The Complete Third Season)
 The Muppet Show (Season 2)
 Nip/Tuck (Season 4)
 The Office (Season 3)
 Rome (Season 2)
 Twin Peaks (Season 2)
 Ugly Betty (Season 1)

Best Overall DVD
The Prestige
 Blood Diamond
 Children of Men
 The Flying Scotsman
 Little Children
 The Lives of Others
 Notes on a Scandal
 Pan's Labyrinth
 Rescue Dawn
 Romeo + Juliet (The Music Edition)

Best Youth DVD
Ratatouille
 Care Bears (25th Anniversary Edition)
 Cars
 Charlotte's Web
 Gracie
 The Jungle Book (40th Anniversary Platinum Edition)
 Little Robots (Episode: "Reach for the Sky")
 The Many Adventures of Winnie the Pooh
 The Pebble and the Penguin
 Peter Pan (2-Disc Platinum Edition)
 Transformers (Two-Disc Special Edition)

Outstanding Action/Adventure Game
God of War II
 BioShock
 Gears of War
 The Legend of Zelda: Twilight Princess
 Metal Gear Solid: Portable Ops

Outstanding Puzzle/Strategy Game
Medieval II: Total War
 Civilization IV: Beyond the Sword
 Command & Conquer 3: Tiberium Wars
 Puzzle Quest: Challenge of the Warlords
 World in Conflict

Outstanding Role Playing Game
Super Paper Mario
 The Lord of the Rings Online: Shadows of Angmar
 Persona 3
 The Witcher
 World of Warcraft: The Burning Crusade

Outstanding Sports/Rhythm/Music Game
Guitar Hero II
 Elite Beat Agents
 Forza Motorsport 2
 Pro Evolution Soccer 2007
 Wii Sports

Awards breakdown

Film
Winners:
3 / 3 Juno: Best Actress & Film – Comedy or Musical / Best Screenplay – Original
2 / 2 Elizabeth: The Golden Age: Best Art Direction and Production Design / Best Costume Design
2 / 6 No Country for Old Men: Best Director / Best Film – Drama
1 / 1 The Diving Bell and the Butterfly (Le scaphandre et le papillon): Best Cinematography
1 / 1 Gone Baby Gone: Best Supporting Actress
1 / 1 Grace Is Gone: Best Original Song
1 / 1 Sicko: Best Documentary Film
1 / 2 The Kite Runner: Best Original Score
1 / 2 Ratatouille: Best Animated or Mixed Media Film
1 / 3 300: Best Visual Effects
1 / 3 The Bourne Ultimatum: Best Sound
1 / 3 Lust, Caution (Se, jie): Best Foreign Language Film
1 / 3 Michael Clayton: Best Supporting Actor
1 / 4 American Gangster: Best Film Editing
1 / 4 The Assassination of Jesse James by the Coward Robert Ford: Best Supporting Actor
1 / 4 Before the Devil Knows You're Dead: Outstanding Motion Picture Ensemble
1 / 4 Lars and the Real Girl: Best Actor – Comedy or Musical
1 / 5 Atonement: Best Screenplay – Adapted
1 / 6 Eastern Promises: Best Actor – Drama
1 / 7 La Vie en Rose (La môme): Best Actress – Drama

Losers:
0 / 5 The Golden Compass, The Lookout
0 / 4 Away from Her, Hairspray
0 / 3 Knocked Up, Zodiac
0 / 2 3:10 to Yuma, Across the Universe, Amazing Grace, Beowulf, Enchanted, Margot at the Wedding, Shoot 'Em Up, Talk to Me

Television
Winners:
3 / 3 Dexter: Best Actor – Drama Series / Best Series – Drama / Best Supporting Actor – Series, Miniseries, or Motion Picture Made for Television
2 / 3 Ugly Betty: Best Actress – Comedy or Musical Series / Best Supporting Actress – Series, Miniseries, or Motion Picture Made for Television
1 / 1 The Amazing Mrs Pritchard: Best Miniseries
1 / 1 The Colbert Report: Best Actor – Comedy or Musical Series
1 / 2 Five Days: Best Actor – Miniseries or Motion Picture Made for Television
1 / 2 Mad Men: Outstanding Television Ensemble
1 / 2 Oprah Winfrey Presents: Mitch Albom's For One More Day: Best Motion Picture Made for Television
1 / 3 Pushing Daisies: Best Series – Comedy or Musical Series
1 / 4 Grey's Anatomy: Best Actress – Drama Series
1 / 4 Longford: Best Actress – Miniseries or Motion Picture Made for Television

Losers:
0 / 3 Big Love, Brothers & Sisters, Jane Eyre, The Riches, The Starter Wife
0 / 2 30 Rock, Bury My Heart at Wounded Knee, Chuck, Desperate Housewives, Extras, Life Support, The Trial of Tony Blair, Weeds

References

External links
 2007 Awards at IMDb

Satellite Awards ceremonies
2007 film awards
2007 television awards